Agradoot was a group of Indian film technicians signing collectively as director, a phenomenon unique to Bengali cinema. The Agradoot core unit, formed in 1946, consisted initially of Bibhuti Laha (cameraman, 1915–1997), Jatin Datta (sound), Sailen Ghosal (lab work), Nitai Bhattacharya (scenarist) and Bimal Ghosh (production). The group was active up to the end of 1980s.

Selected filmography

References

External links 

Agradoot in www.citwf.com

Musicians from Kolkata
Bengali film producers
Bengali film directors
Bengali writers
Film theorists
Indian film score composers
Film collectives
Indian artist groups and collectives